Michael Haydn's Symphony No. 33 in B-flat major, Perger 24, Sherman 33, MH 425/652, was mostly written in Salzburg in 1786. Eight years after he stopped writing symphonies, Haydn re-examined this work and decided to add a Minuet to it. The Minuet is listed in the Sherman & Donley catalog as MH 652, with a cross-reference from MH 425.

Scored for 2 oboes, 2 bassoons, 2 horns, 2 trumpets, timpani and strings, in four movements:

Vivace
Adagietto cantabile, in F major
Minuet and Trio (1797)
Presto mà non troppo

References
 A. Delarte, "A Quick Overview Of The Instrumental Music Of Michael Haydn" Bob's Poetry Magazine November 2006: 28 PDF
 Charles H. Sherman and T. Donley Thomas, Johann Michael Haydn (1737 - 1806), a chronological thematic catalogue of his works. Stuyvesant, New York: Pendragon Press (1993)
 C. Sherman, "Johann Michael Haydn" in The Symphony: Salzburg, Part 2 London: Garland Publishing (1982): lxviii

Symphony 33
Compositions in B-flat major
1786 compositions